The International Mugham Center of Azerbaijan is a center of Azerbaijani arts and music aiming to promote, preserve and popularize the mugham genre of Azerbaijani music. It is located in Baku Boulevard, in downtown Baku.

Overview of the center
The Mugham Center was built on initiative of the First Lady of Azerbaijan, Mehriban Aliyeva. Mugham is a genre included in the representative list of the UNESCO Intangible Cultural Heritage of Humanity. The official opening of the International Mugham Center took place on December 27, 2008.
UNESCO's ninth Director-General Koichiro Matsuura also participated in that opening ceremony.

Architectural description 
The construction of the building started in April, 2005. The center covers 7,500 square meters and has 3 stories. The funding was provided by the Heydar Aliyev Foundation. The design of the building was based on the elements and shapes of the tar, an Azeri musical instrument used in performing mugham. Furthermore, the center was commenced on the base of the architecture works of the Vahid Tansu, Xauddin Yayk and Etirne Ahmed. The concert hall fits 350 people. The center also has a club, 80-seat restaurant called "Ud", study halls and record studios. Modern heating and ventilation systems were also provided in the center. The building was constructed with equipments from Italy, Austria, France and Turkey.

Target of the center 
The center hosts mugham festivals, concerts, and recitals of various singers and performers. Young performers get aware of the art of mugham which has a special role in the Azerbaijani music culture. The center hosts famous masters, mugham evenings, international conferences as well as festivals.

Attendants of the projects 
Participants come from different countries such as Spain, Netherlands, Belgium, Slovenia, USA, Germany, France, Great Britain, Tajikistan, Iran, Uzbekistan, Turkey, China, India, Tunisia, Jordan and Russia.

International World of Mugham Festival 
The International World of Mugham Festival was held on Heydar Aliyev Foundation’s initiative, on March 18–25, 2009, in Baku.  The opening ceremony of the festival was held on March 20, in the International Mugham Center of Azerbaijan. A contest of mugham singers, multiple mugham operas, symphonic and classical mugham concerts were held during the festival. The festival was concluded by gala concert, which was held on March 25, 2009 in Heydar Aliyev Palace, in Baku.

A scientific symposium of mugham was held during the international festival and lasted for 3 days.  About 30 scientists, musicians, and also promoters of traditional eastern music from the more than 16 countries took part at the symposium. Presentations about musical cultures of Azerbaijan, Iran, Turkey, Pakistan, India, Tunisia, Uzbekistan, Tajikistan were given during the festival and the issue of First Nagorno-Karabakh War was also raised there.

Notes

External links
 About the Center: website of Azerbaijan Ministry of Culture and Tourism, accessed 25.10.2014

Buildings and structures in Baku
Tourist attractions in Baku
Music venues in Azerbaijan
2008 establishments in Azerbaijan